The 52nd edition of the annual Four Hills Tournament was held in the traditional venues: Oberstorf and Garmisch-Partenkirchen in Germany, and Innsbruck and Bischofshofen in Austria.

Format

At each of the four events, a qualification round was held. The 50 best jumpers qualified for the competition. The fifteen athletes leading the World Cup at the time qualified automatically. In case of an omitted qualification or a result that would normally result in elimination, they would instead qualify as 50th.

Unlike the procedure at normal World Cup events, the 50 qualified athletes were paired up for the first round of the final event, with the winner proceeding to the second round. The rounds start with the duel between #26 and #25 from the qualification round, followed by #27 vs #24, up to #50 vs #1. The five best duel losers, so-called 'Lucky Losers' also proceed.

For the tournament ranking, the total points earned from each jump are added together. The World Cup points collected during the four events are disregarded in this ranking.

Pre-Tournament World Cup Standings

At the time of the tournament, eight out of twenty-eight events were supposed to be completed, but three were cancelled.

The standings were as follows:

Participating nations and athletes

The number of jumpers a nation was allowed to nominate was dependent on previous results. In Innsbruck and Bischofshofen, the amount of Austrian athletes was doubled.

The defending champion was Janne Ahonen. Six other competitors had also previously won the Four Hills tournament: Andreas Goldberger in 1992-93 and 1994-95, Primož Peterka in 1996-97, Kazuyoshi Funaki in 1997-98, Andreas Widhölzl in 1999-00, Adam Małysz in 2000-01 and Sven Hannawald in 2001-02.

The following athletes were nominated:

Results

Oberstorf
 Schattenbergschanze, Oberstorf
28-29 December 2003

Jumping 133.0 meters, Sigurd Pettersen was already in the lead after the first round. During the rest of the tournament, only Martin Höllwarth equalled this distance. In the last jump, Pettersen then soared to 143.5 meters, setting a new hill record and securing his victory.

Qualification winner:  Sigurd Pettersen

Garmisch-Partenkirchen
 Große Olympiaschanze, Garmisch-Partenkirchen
31 December 2003 - 1 January 2004

Qualification winner:  Janne Ahonen

Innsbruck
 Bergiselschanze, Innsbruck
03-04 January 2004

Aged 24, Slovenian jumper Peter Žonta celebrated the first and only World Cup victory of his career in Innsbruck. Runners-up Lindström, for whom two second places were career bests, was denied this honour.

Qualification winner:  Janne Ahonen

Bischofshofen
 Paul-Ausserleitner-Schanze, Bischofshofen
05-6 January 2004

Qualification winner:  Andreas Küttel

Final ranking

References

External links
 FIS website
 Four Hills Tournament web site

 
Fis Ski Jumping World Cup, 2003-04
Fis Ski Jumping World Cup, 2003-04